Between Eleven and Midnight (French: Entre onze heures et minuit) is a 1949 French mystery crime film directed by Henri Decoin and starring stars Louis Jouvet, Madeleine Robinson and Monique Mélinand. Yvette Etiévant appears in an early role. It was shot at the Billancourt Studios in Paris. The film's sets were designed by the art director Emile Alex.

Synopsis
The lifeless body of a smuggler is discovered in Paris, killed shortly before midnight. Due to his close physical resemblance to police inspector Carrel, the detective assumes his identity in order to infiltrate the gang.

Cast
 Louis Jouvet as L'inspecteur Carrel 
 Madeleine Robinson as Lucienne 
 Léo Lapara as L'inspecteur Perpignan 
 Monique Mélinand as Irma  
 Jean Meyer as Victor  
 Simone Sylvestre as Léone  
 Janine Viénot 
 Robert Vattier as Charlie  
 Jacques Morel as Bouture  
 Yvette Etiévant as La fille  
 Marianne Hardy as Marie-Louise 
 Paul Barge as Le médecin légiste  
 Jean-Claude Malouvier 
 Jacques Roux
 Gisèle Casadesus as Florence
 Robert Arnoux as Rossignol 
 Charles Bayard as L'armurier 
 Anne Campion as Tonia  
 Maurice Chevit as L'employé aux empreintes 
 Janine Clairville as La modéliste 
 Jacques Denoël as Joi
 Guy Favières as Le marinier  
 Gisèle François 
 Josette Hanson 
 Nicole Jonesco as L'apprentie 
 Marcel Loche 
 Jacqueline Mansard 
 René Pascal
 Jacqueline Pierreux as Marceline 
 Guy Saint-Clair
 Sylvie Serliac
 Germaine Stainval as La concierge  
 Jean Sylvère as Le clochard  
 Constance Thierry

References

Bibliography
 Palmer, Tim &  Michael, Charlie. Directory of World Cinema: France. Intellect Books, 2013.

External links

1949 films
1940s French-language films
Films directed by Henri Decoin
French black-and-white films
French mystery films
1949 mystery films
1940s French films
Films shot in Paris